Poster Boys is a 2017 Indian Hindi-language comedy film written, co-produced and directed by Shreyas Talpade in his directorial debut. The film features Sunny Deol, Bobby Deol, Shreyas Talpade along with Sonali Kulkarni, Samikssha Batnagar and Tripti Dimri. The film is an official remake of the Marathi film Poshter Boyz which Talpade himself had produced and acted in. It is inspired by a real-life incident about three porters who found their pictures on a vasectomy poster. Produced by Sony Pictures Networks Productions, Sunny Sounds Pvt. Ltd. and Affluence Movie Pvt. Ltd., Poster Boys is released on 8 September 2017.

Plot 

Three men meet their bad luck for an unknown reason. Arjun Singh proposes to his girlfriend Riya is rejected by her father for "he can't get his daughter married to such a person", leaving Arjun frustrated and upset. Jaagavar Chaudhary is married to Sunita. He      is preparing his younger sister Anjali's engagement ceremony when he's told that the fiancé and his family have changed their mind of engaging with Anjali for "they cannot accept an alliance with such a shameful family". Vinay Kumar Sharma is a primary teacher whose wife Suraj Mukhi suddenly leaves him and asks for divorce for she cannot forgive his "irresponsible deeds".

The three confused and upset men one day coincidentally meet somewhere on a bridge when they come across a bus that has a poster of their photos, promoting vasectomy, at the back. They come to know that this poster is the reason they are defamed as none of them had that operation and their photos were used without their permission. They decide to find out who is behind it and solve it.

They later find that two government employees from the Health Department, the organizers of that promotion, are responsible for the incident. They find the two employees and ask them to remove all the posters in the city with their unauthorized photos and make a public apology and demand compensation. The two agree but request time to do that.

During the given days, the two don't try to fulfill their promise, but instead ask their senior to help, and their senior, the Health Minister does not try to solve it but to cover it up. At the deadline date, the three can't find the two government employees to fulfill their promise so they turn to their superior for help, who refuses to meet them. The three desperate men then decide to sue the Health Department.

They fail the case because the Health Department use a lot of fake evidence including faked documents showing that they willingly finished the operation and asked to post their photos. But the incident goes viral with help of a local reporter and they are gaining people's support.

During a press conference suggested by the same reporter, angered Arjun announces that they will protest naked if the authority don't give them justice, drawing attention of greater public to this incident.

They start their naked protest at the promised day with only underpants, and people supporting them also uploaded videos of them naked supporting the three's request. The incident finally reaches the Chief Minister, who rushes to the scene to control the situation. The Chief Minister, knowing all the truth behind it, announces that the three are innocent and the Health Department is responsible for the incident and the government will give them compensation.

Riya's father, convinced of Arjun's innocence and moved by his courage, agrees his proposal. Anjali's fiancé agrees to marry her. Vinay's wife returns to him too.

Cast
Sunny Deol as Jaagavar Chaudhary
Bobby Deol as Vinay Kumar Sharma
Shreyas Talpade as Arjun Singh
Sonali Kulkarni as Sunita Chaudhary (Jaagavar's wife)
Samikssha Batnagar as Suraj Mukhi Sharma (Vinay's wife)
Tripti Dimri as Riya (Arjun's girlfriend)
Lovely Singh as Anjali Chaudhary (Jaagavar's sister)
Ashwini Kalsekar as Lady Doctor
Ajeet Singh as Murari, Arjun's Friend
Purnima Varma as Aashtha (School Teacher)
Farhana Fatema as Rekha Madam (Technical Director)
Ajay Devgan as himself (special appearance)
Arshad Warsi as himself (special appearance)
Tusshar Kapoor as himself (special appearance)
Kunal Khemu as himself (special appearance)
Parineeti Chopra as herself (special appearance)
Rohit Shetty as himself (special appearance)
Randheer Rai as Anuj Chaudhary
Dharmendra as Amol Chaudhary Sharma (cameo appearance)
Raashul Tandon as Reporter
Dilip Prabhavalkar as old man
Bharti Achrekar as Amma
Sachin Khedekar as Chief Minister Jagdev Ahlawat
Murali Sharma as Health Minister
Jitendra Joshi as photographer
Elli Avram in an item song "Kudiya Shehar Di"

Soundtrack

The music of the film is composed by Tanishk Bagchi, Daler Mehndi, Rishi Rich, Sunai Marathe, Shreyas Iyengar and Sonny Ravan while the lyrics have been penned by Shabbir Ahmed, Javed Akhtar, Kumaar, Saurabh M Pandey and Sonny Ravan. Daler Mehndi's hit track "Kudiyan Shehar Diyan" from the 1999 film Arjun Pandit was recreated for this film with Elli AvrRam appearing in this song. It was released on 11 August 2017. The second song "Kendhi Menoo" which is sung by Yash Narvekar, Sukriti Kakar and Ikka Singh was released on 18 August 2017. The soundtrack was released on 19 August 2017 by T-Series which consists of only four songs.

References

External links
 
 

Columbia Pictures films
2017 films
2010s Hindi-language films
Films scored by Tanishk Bagchi
Films scored by Rishi Rich
Indian comedy films
2017 comedy films
Hindi remakes of Marathi films
Sony Pictures Networks India films
2017 directorial debut films
Hindi-language comedy films
Sony Pictures films